Since 2010, Jan Petersen from the Social Democrats had been mayor of Norddjurs Municipality. In all 3 elections from the 2009 Norddjurs municipal election and on, the Social Democrats had won 11 seats, with Venstre coming second with 6 seats. However, in this election, the Social Democrats would suffer a seat loss of 2. Venstre and Danish People's Party, from the traditional blue bloc, would lose 1 and 2 seats respectively. However, due to The New Right and Liberal Alliance gaining 1 seat and the Conservatives gaining 2 seats, the traditional blue bloc had a majority for the first time since the creation of Norddjurs Municipality. This resulted in Kasper Bjerregaard from Venstre becoming mayor.

Electoral system
For elections to Danish municipalities, a number varying from 9 to 31 are chosen to be elected to the municipal council. The seats are then allocated using the D'Hondt method and a closed list proportional representation.
Norddjurs Municipality had 27 seats in 2021

Unlike in Danish General Elections, in elections to municipal councils, electoral alliances are allowed.

Electoral alliances  

Electoral Alliance 1

Electoral Alliance 2

Electoral Alliance 3

Results

Notes

References 

Norddjurs